Richmond Local Municipality is an administrative area in the UMgungundlovu District of KwaZulu-Natal in South Africa.

Richmond was named after the Earl of Richmond, father in law of Sir Peregrine Maitland, Governor of the Cape from 1844 to 1847.

Main places
The 2001 census divided the municipality into the following main places:

Politics 

The municipal council consists of fourteen members elected by mixed-member proportional representation. Seven councillors are elected by first-past-the-post voting in seven wards, while the remaining seven are chosen from party lists so that the total number of party representatives is proportional to the number of votes received. In the election of 1 November 2021 the African National Congress (ANC) won a majority of nine seats on the council.
The following table shows the results of the election.

References

External links
 http://www.richmond.gov.za/

Local municipalities of the Umgungundlovu District Municipality